Juiced: Eliminator is a racing video game developed by the British studio Juice Games and published by THQ. It was released in June 2006 exclusively for the PlayStation Portable handheld system and released on mobile in July 2006 as Juiced 3D. It features a new mode where the player must try not to be eliminated, hence the title of the game. The game is a sequel to Juiced and features a rebooted plot from the original, where players start out a racing career in Angel City.

Plot 
The game concentrates on the racing career of the player's character in Angel City. The player begins racing against a new crew leader called Nina, who shows little respect for newcomers. She lets the player use one of her cars and strikes a wager similar to TK in the original Juiced. After the player is able to beat Nina in the race, more options in the game are opened up and she becomes an ally. After the tutorial, the player is given a wider choice of race events that allow the player to collect cars and gain further recognition from Nina and other crew leaders.

Gameplay 
There are six types of races:
 Circuit: Standard racing, complete a circuit within the set number of laps.
 Point-to-point: Race from start to finish.
 Sprint: A drag race (manual controller only). The player races three opponents in a three heat series race, gaining a total of points after each heat determines the winner.
 Showoff: Timed race, the player can perform various tricks, such as donut spins, bootleg turns, 360's, J-turns and drifting.
 Eliminator: Race around the racetrack in a number of laps. The last person on each lap is out of the race. The race finishes when one driver remains.
 Relay race: (2,2,2 and 3,3).
Juiced Eliminator also has a mode called Career Challenge. The mode is an extra career that is set by the crew leaders, where the player has to complete a number of races in a limited number of days (and months) to finish the challenge.

Reception 

The game received “mixed” reviews according to the video game review aggregator Metacritic.

See also 
 Juiced
 Juiced 2: Hot Import Nights

References

External links 

2006 video games
PlayStation Portable games
PlayStation Portable-only games
THQ games
1.1
Street racing video games
Video games developed in the United Kingdom
Video game sequels
Multiplayer and single-player video games
Mobile games